Dan Humphries (born 27 August 1979 in Newport, Wales) is a former bobsledder for Team GB and Canada. Dan was a member of the Royal Air Force and competed for Great Britain at the 2006 Winter Olympics sponsored by the RAF.

He won the World Cup four-man event at Park City, Utah on 14 November 2009. He retired from the sport after the 2010 Winter Olympics.

References

External links
 
 Dan Humphries at Bobsleigh Canada Skeleton

1979 births
Sportspeople from Newport, Wales
Bobsledders at the 2006 Winter Olympics
British male bobsledders
Canadian male bobsledders
Living people
Olympic bobsledders of Great Britain
Welsh emigrants to Canada
21st-century Royal Air Force personnel